Stan Stammers (born 19 May 1961, England) is an English musician best known as the bass player for the bands Theatre of Hate, Spear of Destiny and Plastic Eaters.

Early life

Stammers grew up in Saffron Walden, Essex. He got into punk music by going to see live bands at Cambridge Corn Exchange and other nearby venues. Stammers' first band was 'The Jump', based in Newport, a village close to Saffron Walden and from an early age his main influence for playing bass was Slade's bass player Jimmy Lea, who he cites as an influence today, along with Paul Simonon (The Clash), Bruce Foxton (The Jam) and Horace Panter (The Specials).

Musical career
The first major band that Stammers joined was The Straps in 1979, followed by British post-punk band Theatre of Hate in 1980, formed by both Kirk Brandon and Stammers, and managed by Terry Razor.

Before joining Theatre of Hate Stan played for punk band the Epileptics and later The Straps. Stammers turned down an offer to join punk band UK Subs to be in Theatre of Hate with Kirk Brandon.

During their two-year existence Theatre of Hate released a number of singles and albums, most notably "Legion", the B-side to the first single "Original Sin", the Westworld album which was produced by Mick Jones of The Clash, and the "Westworld" single which went to No. 40 in the UK charts, qualifying the band for an appearance on Top of the Pops.

In January 1983 after the demise of Theatre of Hate, Brandon and Stammers started Spear of Destiny. The band would have numerous line-up changes until Stammers left in 1986. From the onset, the band became well known for their live shows, and quickly captured a faithful following. In the early period that Stammers was with the band, they released a number of notable singles and albums. In March 1986, Stammers decided to leave the band to work on his own material and to start a new band.

In mid-1986, Stammers formed Crazy Pink Revolvers. In January 1987, CPR recorded their first studio album First Down, released by Chainsaw Records. In early 1987, CPR signed to ABC Records and recorded the Timeless Smile EP. Early in 1988, the band recorded their second album At the Rivers Edge. In January 1989, CPR recorded their second single, "Wednesday 19:45". The single which was taken from the album was written about the Kings Cross fire on the London Underground in 1988. In March 1989, Stammers decided to leave the band and in September 1989 left London with his American girlfriend to live in Philadelphia, US.

Stammers teamed up again with Kirk Brandon in 1990 for 4 years doing a number of tours and a couple of albums under the Spear of Destiny, Theatre of Hate, Elephant Daze and 10:51 banners. During this time, Stammers would also play with his own band Boy Boy Nova, as well as running a recording studio. In 1990, Spear of Destiny reformed for three nights at London's famous Marquee Club, and the following year went on a UK wide tour as Theatre of Hate. In 1992, Spear of Destiny recorded the album SOD's Law and did another UK tour. In early 1993, Kirk Brandon moved to Philadelphia where they toured off and on for over a year as Theatre of Hate, and for a few gigs as Elephant Daze. In mid-1994, the band recorded as Kirk Brandon's 10:51. An album, Stone in the Rain was released in the UK in 1995 and as Theatre of Hate, it was released under the title Retribution in the U.S. in 1996. The single "Children of the Damned" was also released. In December 1994, Stammers decided to leave the band.

Plastic Eaters were formed in Philadelphia in early 1996. Stammers had approach James Atkin, the lead singer from EMF. The band played gigs around the US. In December 2008, Plastic Eaters released a version of the Slade hit "Merry X-Mas Everybody" as a digital download release.

As well as working with his band Theatre of Hate, rejoining in 2012 as a full-time member, Stammers also runs his own music production company, Plastic Eater Sound with his business partner Rob Daly. He also works as a session musician for various artists, which includes both live and studio work.

As of December 2017, Stammers had reformed Crazy Pink Revolvers as a side project alongside his work with Theatre of Hate, and as of May 2018, were to tour the United Kingdom.

References

Chart runs in the UK Singles Chart since 1952

External links
 Stan Stammers (official website)
 Crazy Pink Revolvers (official website)
 Plastic Eater Sound (official website)
 Plastic Eaters (their website from 2012 to 2013)
 Plastic Eaters (their website from 2001 to 2011)
 Plastic Eaters (their website from 2000)
 Plastic Eaters (their original website from 1997 to 1998)
 The Engine Room – Spear of Destiny's Rhythm Section

1961 births
Living people
People from Saffron Walden
English bass guitarists
English male guitarists
Male bass guitarists
British post-punk musicians
Theatre of Hate members
Spear of Destiny (band) members